Halocortolone is a synthetic glucocorticoid corticosteroid which was never marketed.

References

Chloroarenes
Diketones
Fluoroarenes
Glucocorticoids
Pregnanes